The Challenge Prince Rainier III is a domestic football cup in Monaco, featuring teams from across the country. The tournament has been organised annually since 1975 and since then has been known as the premier footballing tournament for amateur teams within the principality.

Because Monaco is not a member of UEFA, there is no qualification for the winners into either the UEFA Champions League, UEFA Europa League, or UEFA Conference League.

History
The tournament was created in 1975 after Prince Rainier III requested a footballing tournament in the country be played.

President of the Organizing Committee, Joseph Destefanis, recalled how the only football game of the year had an air of folklore among the players and of the palace of Monaco. At the time the teams were completed and at the request of Prince Rainier III, the competition has grown.

Format
In the first round of the competition, the teams are placed into groups for a round-robin stage. The best teams from these groups progress to the knockout rounds of the Challenge Prince Rainier III. The lower teams from each group then qualify for the knockout stages of the Trophée Ville de Monaco, the second level cup in Monaco underneath the Challenge Prince Rainier III.

Champions

Source:

See also
Challenge Monégasque
Trophée Ville de Monaco
Football in Monaco
List of football clubs in Monaco

References

Footnotes

Football competitions in Monaco